Working Man's Clothes Productions is a New York City theater company that was founded in January 2005. It is a sponsored project of Fractured Atlas. It has won a number of awards including IT-Awards. The company name was taken from a line of Ralph Waldo Emerson, "Common sense is genius dressed in working man's clothes." The company focuses on new works by emerging playwrights. The company has produced at such venues as 59East59, Under St. Mark's, Gene Frankel Theatre, and The Ohio Theatre in SoHo. The company is a member of OOBCOM, a community of Off-Off Broadway Theatre Artists.

Artists

Artistic Council
Jared Culverhouse
Darcie Champagne
Adam Belvo
Terry Jenkins

Founding Members
Isaac Byrne
Jared Culverhouse
Amanda “Maggie” Hamilton
Bekah Brunstetter
Michael Mason

Productions
She Like Girls by Chisa Hutchinson (2009)
Fresh Kills by Elyzabeth Gregory Wilder
Pulling Teeth by Brandon Koebernick (2005)
To Nineveh: A Modern Miracle Play by Bekah Brunstetter (2005)
Men Eat Mars Bars While Touching Their Penis by Jennifer Slack-Eaton (2006)
Many Worlds by William Borden
Penetrator by Anthony Neilson
I Used To Write On Walls by Bekah Brunstetter (2007)
Intercourse by Brandon Koebernick (2005)
The Marvelous Misadventures of William Zzylk by John Paul DeSena
Green by Bekah Brunstetter
Playoff Picture by John Paul DeSena
Boop by John Paul DeSena (2006)
Hill by Amy Schulz
Arms by Bekah Brunstetter (2006)
Oceanside Parkway by Eric Sanders (2006)
Tremble by Dan Basila,: Happy Birthday / I'm Dead by Bekah Brunstetter
Azucar by Jon Key
Restaurants at Beautiful Times by Dave McGinnis
Oblivia by Eric Sanders
Bloody Elephants by Casey Wimpee (2006)
The Impotence of Being Ernest by Joshua Hill
Marriage Play by Bekah Brunstetter
Arms and the Octopus by Casey Wimpee (2007)
Atlas, or Constellation Golf, by Casey Wimpee (2007)
Wood by Justin Cooper (2007)
Sharpen My Dick by Greg Romero (2007)
Candy Room by William Charles Meny (2007)
The Saddest Thing in the History of the World by Kyle Jarrow (2007)
1.1-1.7 by Eric Sanders
Charlie Amsterdam's Wine Tasting Kick-Off
My Shoes Are In Secaucus by Jennie Eng
Carla Rhodes and Cecil
Empty by Kyle Jarrow
V-Low's Meat Market vs. Nico & the Astronaut
Wanting It by Libby Emmons
Stumblebum Brass Band
Hot Damn by Casey Wimpee (2007)
Cudzoo
Not So Bad Once You Get Used To It by John Paul DeSena
Greg Walloch
Clay McLeod Chapman
Lords of Chaos by Eric Sanders
Lil Miss Lixx burlesque
Scarlet O'Gasm burlesque
New York Is Dead
5 Boroughs on Fire
The Wooster Wake
Abandon All Hope

Awards and nominations
2007 New York Innovative Theatre Awards
Nomination, Outstanding Original Short Script - Justin Cooper, "Wood" - fuckplays
Nomination, Outstanding Original Short Script - Casey Wimpee, "Arms and the Octopus" - fuckplays
Nomination, Outstanding Actor in a Leading Role - Julian James Muhammed, fuckplays
2006 New York Innovative Theatre Awards
Outstanding Ensemble, Outstanding Director, Outstanding Sound Design, Outstanding Original Full-length Script, Outstanding Production of a Play "To Nineveh: A Modern Miracle", Working Man's Clothes - Isaac Byrne, Maggie Hamilton, Paul DeSena, David Carr-Berry, Jared Culverhouse, Ellen David, Paul Fears, Andaye' Hill, Julian James, Gregory Porter Miller & Brian Schlanger.
2010 GLAAD Media Awards
Winner Outstanding New York Theater: Off Off Broadway- "She Like Girls" by Chisa Hutchinson

Programs
The company is well known for its developmental series, which has workshopped staged readings of numerous plays including Boom Vang by Larry Pontius, Breath and Grandma's Box, The Life of Mary Berry, Double Hernia by Mark Charney, Handicapping by James McClindon, 37 Stones by Mark Charney, Night by David Carr-Berry, The Woodpecker by Samuel Brett Williams, "The Authorities" by Andrew Rosendorf, Heartless by Eric Sanders, "She Like Girls" by Chisa Hutchinson.

In May 2007 the company launched its Lost Works Series with the New York City premiere of Anthony Neilson's Penetrator.

References

Theatre in New York City